Merrick and Rosso Unplanned was a free-form talk show hosted by Australian comedians Merrick Watts and Tim Ross, based on the UK talk show Baddiel and Skinner Unplanned. Produced by Granada Australia, the series debuted on the Nine Network on 3 September 2003. The show was the network television debut for the comedy duo.

A highlight of the series involved comedian Scott Thomson who was dragged on stage to perform a stand-up comedy routine which poked fun at Australian personalities, in particular Nikki Webster and Democrats politician Natasha Stott-Despoja. A telephone number appeared on screen at the end of the segment for viewers to call who had taken offence at Thomson's material.

See also
 The Merrick & Rosso Show
 Merrick and Rosso

External links 
 

2003 Australian television series debuts
2004 Australian television series endings
Nine Network original programming